The Deputy Commissioner of Police of the Metropolis, commonly referred to simply as the Deputy Commissioner, is the second-in-command of London's Metropolitan Police Service. The rank is senior to Assistant Commissioner, but junior by one rank to Commissioner. The Deputy Commissioner's salary from 1 September 2010 is £214,722, making them the second highest paid British police officer.

History
The rank of Deputy Commissioner was formally established as a separate rank, additional to the assistant commissioners, in 1931. However, the Assistant Commissioner "A" had acted as de facto deputy for some years and had been given the courtesy title of Deputy Commissioner since 1922. The Deputy Commissioner's Crown appointment continued to be Assistant Commissioner of Police of the Metropolis until at least the early 1970s. Sir Jim Starritt may have been the first officer to have been appointed Deputy Commissioner by the Crown.

Insignia
The badge of rank worn on the epaulettes by the Deputy Commissioner is unique in the British police service, this being a crown, above two small pips placed side by side, above crossed tipstaves in a wreath. This badge was introduced in 2001; before that the Deputy Commissioner wore the same rank badge as the assistant commissioners – a crown over crossed tipstaves in a wreath.

Deputy Commissioners
Those listed in bold type became Commissioner.
Sir James Olive, 1922–1925
Vice-Admiral Sir Charles Royds, 1926–1931
The Hon. Sir Trevor Bigham, 1931–1935
Colonel The Hon. Sir Maurice Drummond, 1935–1946
Sir John Nott-Bower, 1946–1953
Sir Ronald Howe, 1953–1957
Joseph Simpson, 1957–1958
Sir Alexander Robertson, 1958–1961
Douglas Webb, 1961–1966
Lieutenant-Colonel Sir Ranulph Bacon, 1966
Sir John Waldron, 1966–1968
Robert Mark, 1968–1972
John Hill, 1972
Sir Jim Starritt, 1972–1975
Sir Colin Woods, 1975–1977
Patrick Kavanagh, 1977–1983
Albert Laugharne, 1983–1985
Peter Imbert, 1985–1987
Sir John Dellow, 1987–1991
Sir John Smith, 1991–1995
Sir Brian Hayes, 1995–1998
Sir John Stevens, 1998–2000
Sir Ian Blair, 2000–2005
Sir Paul Stephenson, 2005–2009
Tim Godwin, 2009–2011
Sir Craig Mackey, 2012–2018
Sir Steve House, 2018–2022 (acting commissioner  20212022)
Helen Ball, 2021–2022 (acting)
Dame Lynne Owens, 2023–present (interim 2022–2023)

Footnotes

 
Ranks in the Metropolitan Police